Maliq & D'Essentials is a jazz and soul music based band from Jakarta, Indonesia. Since their appearance in the Jakarta International Java Jazz Festival in 2005, Maliq & D'Essentials popularity has increased, especially among young people in Jakarta.

The combination of Indonesian and English in their songs has become one of the typical flagships of their music. Their work is considered to be distinctive among other Indonesian music.

Biography
Maliq & D'Essentials was conceived on 15 May 2002 with 8 personnels under a genre they call organic music. The name MALIQ itself is an acronym from Music And Live Instrument Quality as the brainchild of brothers Angga & Widi Puradiredja (the group’s vocalist and drummer, respectively; as well as producer, composer and arranger for the group). The completion of the band became full circle with the presence of Indah & Dimi (vocals), Ifa (keys), Jawa (bass), Satrio (guitars) and Amar (horns). The group started out performing soul and soul-inspired music at different lounges and cafes in Jakarta. The first two years they went through was a solidification process for the group; as well as a way to introduce soul and/or soulful-inspired music to the Indonesian public; as it is yet to be widely known at the time of the group’s establishment.

2004-06: 1st
Come 2004, Maliq & D'Essentials officially became part of the Indonesian music recording industry with the release of their premiere album, 1st, with the single "Terdiam". A second single, "Untitled", soon followed and became the hit song that put the group on the map. The third single from their premiere album, "Sampai Kapan", is a collaboration with Malaysian songstress Camelia. The fourth and final single from 1st Maliq & D'Essentials is entitled "Kangen". By 2006, the group released a repackaged version of their premiere album entitled 1st Maliq & D'Essentials Special Edition with a hit single entitled "The One". At the same time, Dimi one of the vocalist decided to leave the band to pursue a solo career. The group’s first record had not only given them a name for themselves in the Indonesian music industry, but also gave way to their rise to fame in neighboring countries of Malaysia, Singapore and Brunei Darussalam.

By this time, the group has achieved so many as a new artist: whether commercially and critically, domestically and regionally. They were nominated for and/or won many awards such as MTV Indonesia Music Awards, Anugerah Planet Muzik, AMI Awards, & MTV Asia Awards.

2007-08: Free Your Mind
In early 2007, Maliq & D'Essentials released their sophomore record, Free Your Mind with a hit single entitled "Heaven"; followed by "Beri Cinta Waktu" as a second single not long after. Two more noteworthy achievements happened during this particular time. The first was being awarded Best Jazz Album for Free Your Mind in the 2008 AMI Awards. The second was a soundtrack for a major motion picture. Thus, two singles from Free Your Mind (Repackaged) (released early 2008) "Dia" and "Kau Yang Bisa", became the original soundtrack for the movie Claudia/Jasmine. In August 2008, they also performed a concert at Brisbane, Australia to entertain Indonesian students who are in the country.

2009: Mata Hati Telinga
Around this time, the group went through another change in their core personnel. After Dimi’s departure around 2006; Satrio, the group’s guitarist decided to leave and was quickly replaced by Arya Aditya Ramadhya, more widely known as "Lale". By 2009, the group released their newest record entitled Mata Hati Telinga. Now the youngest member of Maliq & D’Essentials, Lale with his rock background had added another color to the group’s unique sound. The pop-rock up-tempo song "Pilihanku" was chosen as the first single from the third album. It was somewhat different from what the public would know of Maliq & D'Essentials; although the group’s color never faded away from the newly explored influences. Along with second single "Coba Katakan", Maliq & D'Essentials was able to broaden the horizon of their listeners and/or fans. The third album Mata Hati Telinga also received the title as the "Best Album 2009" by Rolling Stone Indonesia magazine.

Another milestone for the group; along with the release of Mata Hati Telinga album was the introduction of The One Management and Organic Records. It was created to accommodate the group with a comprehensive, open, secure, proper and prestigious management; along with a record company that would give them as much freedom to explore their music. In addition through Organic Records, Maliq & D'Essentials assumed the role of executive producers for great new talents such as Twentyfirst Night, Boogiemen, Soulvibe, Renita, Djemima, Sir Dandy, Rock n Roll Mafia and The Upstairs.

In March 2009, Maliq & D'Essentials performed for the fourth time at the 5th annual Jakarta International Java Jazz Festival, after being absent the previous year. The performance featured The Organic All-Stars which included Twentyfirst Night, Boogiemen and Renita. Recorded live at the Jakarta Convention Centre, the performance became an addition to the group’s discography as a DVD distributed by early 2010.

Over the years of the group’s existence, they have developed a following of loyal fans, eventually named D’Essentials. By early 2009, a few months before the group’s 7th Anniversary, a formal D’Essentials Team was established. As a result, a premiere (and not to mention quite successful) collaboration between The One Management/Organic Records and D’Essentials happened at Maliq & D'Essentials “7th Year Celebration” to celebrate the group’s 7th Anniversary; as well as a form of appreciation to all D’Essentials who had been supporting them.

2010-11: The Beginning of a Beautiful Life
Their fourth album, The Beginning of a Beautiful Life, was released to the market in June 2010, with the song "Terlalu" as the first single, followed by "Menari" and "Penasaran" as a second single and third single. At this time, Ifa, the group’s keyboardist decided to leave and was replaced by Ilman Ibrahim Isa, more widely known as "Ilman".

In 2011, they had perform in Melbourne, Australia on May and a solo concert Maliq & D'Essentials Live in Malaysia at the KL Live, Kuala Lumpur, Malaysia on December. The concert tickets were sold out by their fans in the country.

2012: Radio Killed the TV Stars
In 2012, Maliq & D'Essentials with some indie musicians from various genres of music participated in a compilation album titled Radio Killed The TV Star, which was released by The One Management and Organic Records. This compilation is a movement from indie musicians and indie record label for Indonesia's music industry. The musicians that have contributed in this album include Maliq & D'Essentials, Endah N Rhesa, Twentyfirst Night, Zore, The Upstairs, Rock 'N Roll Mafia, and others. The single from Maliq & D'Essentials from this compilation album was titled "Berlari dan Tenggelam".

2013: Sriwedari
Their fifth album, Sriwedari, was released on 25 January 2013. The first single from this album is "Setapak Sriwedari" and followed by the second single with a dangdut genre, "Drama Romantika". The third single of this album is "Dunia Sekitar". Different from the previous albums which sound 'American', this fifth album has more of a vintage feel. On behalf of the totality, the album was inspired by several classic British band, mastering a passing phase in the legendary studio where The Beatles worked on music, Abbey Road Studios. The fifth album also received the title as the one of the Best Album 2013 by Rolling Stone Indonesia magazine.

The album was launched in Gandaria City Mall, Jakarta, with Setapak Sriwedari Concert as the event title on 10 February 2013, attended by thousands of Maliq & D'Essentials fans. After "Setapak Sriwedari Concert" was done, the concert was also held in Java Jazz Festival, Bali, and Surabaya. In October 2013, they also performed a showcase named Maliq & D'Essentials Live in Singapore 2013 at The Home Club, Singapore.

After going through so many struggles, changes, trials & tribulations, as well as numerous successes, praises and appreciations, it is certain that Maliq & D'Essentials had taken all their experiences into account and will be able to turn it all into a form of art no less expected of them. After more than a decade, the group had significantly matured into an entity that is quite iconic in the Indonesian music industry.

2014: Musik Pop
In 2014, Maliq & D'Essentials released their sixth album, Musik Pop, on 15 May 2014. "Ananda" is the first single of the album, featuring Indonesian legendary musician Indra Lesmana. The launch of the album itself was held in Jazzy Nite Citos along with the 12 years anniversary of the band, attended by thousands of fans of Maliq & D'Essentials and recorded by Kompas TV. In May 2014, they performed a concert at Sydney, Australia to indulge their fans such as Indonesian student in the country.

2016: Pop Hari Ini
In 2016, MALIQ & D'Essentials alongside other 8 indie musicians released a compilation album titled, "Pop Hari Ini." In this compilation album, MALIQ & D'Essentials also released their latest single, "Mendekat, Melihat, Mendengar." Both album and song are only available on Blibli.com

2017-present: Senandung Senandika
On 1 May 2017, the band announced the release of their seventh album Senandung Senandika, preceded on 2 May by a pair of singles, "Senang" and "Sayap". The album was released digitally on 15 May, coinciding with the band's 15th anniversary, with the album becoming available on CD at the launch event on 21 May. Fans who had pre-ordered a limited amount of signed CDs from Blibli.com were able to receive their copies a few days earlier than general sale.

On 14 February 2021, the group release a six-track EP titled Raya.

Band members

Current members
 Angga Puradiredja – lead vocals (2002–present)
 Indah Wisnuwardhana – lead vocals (2002–present)
 Arya 'Lale' Aditya Ramadhya – guitar (2008–present)
 Dendy 'Javafinger/Jawa' Sukarno – bass (2002–present)
 Ilman Ibrahim Isa' – keys (2011–present)
 Widi Puradiredja – drums (2002–present)

Additional members (only when performing live)
 Reza Jozef "Rejoz" Patty – percussion (2002–present)
 Amar Ibrahim – trumpet (2010–present)
 Menu' Hentiasanti – backing vocals (2006-2008, 2015–present)
 Meilita Kasiman Perwirana – backing vocals (2016–present)

Former members
 Dimi Hapsari – lead vocals (2002–2006)
 Nur Satriatama 'Satrio' – guitar (2002–2007)
 Amar Ibrahim – trumpet (2002-2010)
 Ifa Fachir – keys (2002–2011)
 Renita Martadinata – backing vocals (2006–2011)
 Annisa Fidianti – backing vocals (2011–2015)
 Arlinda Sudarbo – backing vocals (2011–2016)

Discography

Albums

Compilation albums

EP
Raya (2021)

Other singles
 "Tafakur" (2008, Kompilasi LCLM 2008)
 "Prasangka" (2011, A Tribute to KLa Project)
 "Berlari dan Tenggelam" (2012, Kompilasi Radio Killed The TV Stars #1)
 "Barcelona" (2014, Fariz RM & Dian PP in Collaboration With)
 "Mendekat, Melihat, Mendengar" (2016, Kompilasi Pop Hari Ini)
 "Bagaimana Kutahu" (2017, Cerita 25 Tahun Momen Kebersamaan McDonald’s)
 "Lautan Kenangan" (2017, Candra Darusman: Detik Waktu)

DVD
 "MALIQ & D'ESSENTIALS feat. Organic All Stars - Live at the Jakarta International Java Jazz Festival 2009" (2010)

Book
 The Beginning of a Beautiful Life, "a story yet to be told." (2010)

Awards and nominations

Anugerah Musik Indonesia

|-
| 2006
|"The One"
| Best Production || 
|-
| 2008
|"Heaven"
| Best R&B Production || 
|-
| 2008
|"Free Your Mind"
| Best Jazz Album || 
|-
| 2009
|"Dia"
| Best R&B Production || 
|-
| 2010
|"Terlalu"
| Best R&B Production || 
|-
| 2011
|"Maliq & D'Essentials"
| Best Duo/Group Performance || 
|-
| 2011
|"The Beginning of a Beautiful Life"
| Best Jazz Album || 
|-
| 2011
|"The Beginning of a Beautiful Life"
| Best Graphic Design Album || 
|-
| 2013
|"Prasangka"
| Best Pop Duo/Group || 
|-
| 2014
|"Maliq & D'Essentials"
| Best Urban Duo/Group || 
|-
| 2015
|"Maliq & D'Essentials"
| Best Pop Duo/Group || 
|-
| 2015
|"Barcelona (Maliq & D'Essentials ft. Fariz RM)"
| Best Pop Collaboration || 
|-
| 2015
|"Musik Pop"
| Best Album || 
|-
| 2015
|"Himalaya (Widi Puradiredja)"
| Best Songwriter || 
|-
| 2015
|"Aurora"
| Best Urban Production || 
|-
| 2015
|"Ananda"
| Best Urban Production || 
|-
| 2015
|"Semesta"
| Best Original Movie Soundtrack Production || 
|-
| 2015
|"Semesta (Widi Puradiredja)"
| Best Record Director || 
|-
| 2016
|"Mendekat, Melihat, Mendengar"
| Best Soul/R&B/Urban Artist Group/Collaboration || 
|-
| 2017
|"Senandung Senandika"
| Best Album || 
|-
| 2017
|"Senandung Senandika"
| Best Soul/R&B/Urban Album || 
|-
| 2018
|"Bagaimana Kutahu"
| Best Pop Duo/Group/Vocal/Group/Collaboration || 
|-
| 2018
|"Bagaimana Kutahu"
| Best Pop Duo/Group/Vocal/Group/Collaboration || 
|-
| 2018
|"Friends (OST. Partikelir)"
| Best Original Movie Soundtrack Production || 
|-
| 2018
|"Lautan Kenangan"
| Best Urban Production || 

|}

Anugerah Planet Muzik

|-
| 2006
|"Maliq & D'Essentials"
| Best New Duo/Group|| 
|-
| 2006
|"1st"
| Best Album|| 
|-
| 2011
|"'Sampai Kapan' - Atilia & Maliq & D'Essentials"
| Best Collaboration|| 
|}

Dahsyatnya Awards

|-
| 2011
|"Terlalu"
| Best Music Video || 
|}

HAI Reader's Poll Music Awards

|-
| 2012
|"Maliq & D'Essentials"
| Best Stage Act || 
|-
| 2013
|"Maliq & D'Essentials"
| Best Pop || 
|-
| 2013
|"Sriwedari"
| Best Album || 
|-
| 2013
|"Maliq & D'Essentials"
| Best Stage Act || 
|-
| 2013
|"Maliq & D'Essentials"
| Best Costume || 
|-
| 2013
|"Setapak Sriwedari"
| Best Single || 
|-
| 2014
|"Maliq & D'Essentials"
| Best Pop || 
|-
| 2014
|"Musik Pop"
| Best Album || 
|-
| 2015
|"Maliq & D'Essentials"
| Best Pop || 
|}

Indonesia Cutting Edge Music Awards (ICEMA)

|-
| 2010
|"Mata Hati Telinga"
| Favourite Album Packaging || 
|-
| 2010
|"Pilihanku"
| Favourite Pop Song || 
|}

MTV Asia Awards

|-
| 2006
|"Maliq & D'Essentials"
| Most Favorite Artist Indonesia|| 
|}

MTV Indonesia Music Awards

|-
| 2005
|"Maliq & D'Essentials"
| Most Favorite New Artist|| 
|}

NET. Indonesian Choice Awards

|-
| 2014
|"Maliq & D'Essentials"
| Group/Band/Duo/ of The Year|| 
|-
| 2014
|"Setapak Sriwedari"
| Album of The Year|| 
|-
| 2015
|"Musik Pop"
| Album of The Year|| 
|-
| 2017
|"Mendekat, Melihat, Mendengar"
| Music Video of The Year|| 
|}

Yahoo! OMG Awards

|-
| 2013
|"Maliq & D'Essentials"
| Best Group || 
|}

Piala Maya

|-
| 2016
|"Mendekat, Melihat, Mendengar"
| Best Music Video || 
|}

References

Indonesian pop music groups
Indonesian jazz music groups
Nu-disco musicians
Anugerah Musik Indonesia winners